The Danish Act of Succession, adopted on 5 June 1953, restricts the throne to those descended from Christian X and his wife, Alexandrine of Mecklenburg-Schwerin, through approved marriages. Succession is by a change in the law in 2009 governed by absolute primogeniture.

Law of succession
Dynasts lose their right to the throne if they marry without the permission of the monarch, to be given in the Council of State. Individuals born to unmarried dynasts or to former dynasts who married without royal permission, and their descendants, are excluded from the throne. Further, when approving a marriage, the monarch can impose conditions that must be met in order for any resulting offspring to have succession rights. If there is no eligible person(s) to inherit the throne, the Danish Parliament (the Folketing) has the right to elect a new monarch and determine a line of succession.

Line of succession
People in the line of succession are listed with a number signifying their place in the line.
	
  King Frederick IX (1899–1972)
 Queen Margrethe II (born 1940)
 (1) Crown Prince Frederik (b. 1968)
 (2) Prince Christian (b. 2005)
 (3) Princess Isabella (b. 2007)
 (4) Prince Vincent (b. 2011)
 (5) Princess Josephine (b. 2011)
 (6) Prince Joachim (b. 1969)
 (7) Count Nikolai of Monpezat (b. 1999)
 (8) Count Felix of Monpezat (b. 2002)
 (9) Count Henrik of Monpezat (b. 2009)
 (10) Countess Athena of Monpezat (b. 2012)
 (11) Princess Benedikte, Princess of Sayn-Wittgenstein-Berleburg (b. 1944)
 Gustav, 7th Prince of Sayn-Wittgenstein-Berleburg (b. 1969)
 Princess Alexandra of Sayn-Wittgenstein-Berleburg (b. 1970)
 Count Richard von Pfeil und Klein-Ellguth (b. 1999)
  Countess Ingrid von Pfeil und Klein-Ellguth (b. 2003)
  Princess Nathalie of Sayn-Wittgenstein-Berleburg (b. 1975)
 Konstantin Johannsmann (b. 2010)
  Louisa Johannsmann (b. 2015)

Note
The consent to Princess Benedikte's marriage to Prince Richard of Sayn-Wittgenstein-Berleburg in 1968 was given on the condition that their children (and further descendants) would have to take up permanent residence in Denmark during the age of mandatory education if they were to retain their succession rights. Since the condition was not met, Princess Benedikte's children are not deemed to have succession rights and are not included in the official line of succession. It is unclear whether their own descendants will have succession rights if residing in Denmark during the age of mandatory education. One Danish constitutional scholar, the late Professor Henrik Zahle, claimed that the children of Princess Benedikte do have succession rights, but without providing any arguments for the claim.

History
From the London Protocol in 1852 till 1953, various male-line descendants of King Christian IX had succession rights in Denmark except King George I of Greece (former Prince William of Denmark) and subsequent Kings of Greece, whose rights to the Danish throne were blocked by Article VI of the 1863 treaty between Denmark, France, Great Britain and Russia recognising George I as King of the Hellenes.

The new Act of Succession terminated succession rights but left the excluded individuals in possession of their titles. This created a class of people with royal titles but no rights to the throne. As a distinction, those entitled to inherit the throne are called "Prins til Danmark" (Prince to Denmark, although this distinction is not made in English) while those without succession rights are referred to as "Prins af Danmark" (Prince of Denmark).

From 1853 until 1953, the crown passed according to agnatic primogeniture. The monarch in 1953, King Frederick IX, had three daughters but no sons. Before the 1953 act, the heir presumptive to the throne was Hereditary Prince Knud, the King's younger brother. The Hereditary Prince was far less popular than the King was. Further, his mother-in-law, Princess Helena, was accused of supporting the Nazi movement during the Second World War. These factors, combined with a belief that the Salic Law was outdated, resulted in the movement to change the succession law so that Frederick's eldest daughter, the then Princess Margrethe, could inherit the throne. Thus, the Salic law was changed to male-preference primogeniture in 1953, meaning that females could inherit, but only if they had no brothers.

Prince Knud had three children. His sons married without the monarch's permission and lost both their royal titles and succession rights. Only Knud's daughter, the unmarried Princess Elisabeth, retained her rights to the throne. Since her death, the line of succession has consisted only of descendants of King Frederick IX.

Queen Margrethe II's youngest sister, Anne-Marie, married King Constantine II of Greece in 1964. In view of the fact that she was marrying a foreign ruler, although he was himself a Prince of Denmark, consent to the marriage was given on the condition that Anne-Marie renounced her and her descendants' rights to the Danish throne.

In 2008, the Danish parliament voted in favour of a new royal succession law that allows a first-born child to one day ascend the throne regardless of whether it is a boy or a girl, similar to that of Sweden and Norway. The bill was voted through two successive parliaments, and submitted to a referendum, ensuring that, in future, the heir apparent to the throne of Denmark would be the monarch's first-born child. However, the 'yes' did not change the actual line of succession at that time. The Crown Princess gave birth to twins on 8 January 2011. Upon their birth, the twins assumed the fourth and fifth place in the line of succession, according to the absolute primogeniture principle adopted, thereby not giving Prince Vincent precedence over his older sister Princess Isabella.

Excluded people

1863–1953
Prince Aage, renounced in 1914 due to his marriage to Mathilde Calvi and became Count of Rosenborg as a consequence.
Prince Erik, renounced in 1924 due to his marriage to Lois Frances Booth and became Count of Rosenborg as a consequence, they divorced in 1937.
Prince Viggo, renounced in 1924 due to his marriage to Eleanor Margaret Green and became Count of Rosenborg as a consequence.
Prince Oluf, renounced in 1948 due to his marriage to Annie Helene Dorrit Puggard-Müller and became Count of Rosenborg as a consequence, they divorced in 1977.
Prince Flemming Valdemar, renounced in 1949 due to his marriage to Ruth Nielsen and became Count of Rosenborg as a consequence.

1953–present
Prince Gorm, excluded by the new law.
Prince Axel, excluded by the new law.
Prince George Valdemar, excluded by the new law.
Princess Anne-Marie, renounced in 1964 due to her marriage to King Constantine II of the Hellenes.
Prince Ingolf, forfeited in 1968 due to his unauthorised marriage to Inge Terney and became Count of Rosenborg as a consequence.
Prince Christian, forfeited in 1971 due to his unauthorised marriage to Anne Dorte Maltoft-Nielsen and became Count of Rosenborg as a consequence.

See also
 Danish royal family tree

References

Danish throne
Danish monarchy
Succession
Denmark history-related lists